Barney is a city in Richland County, North Dakota, United States. The population was 40 at the 2020 census. Barney was founded in 1899. It is part of the Wahpeton, ND–MN Micropolitan Statistical Area.

Geography
Barney is located at  (46.267428, -97.000220).

Demographics

2010 census
As of the census of 2010, there were 52 people, 24 households, and 14 families residing in the city. The racial makeup of the city was 98.1% White and 1.9% from two or more races.

There were 24 households, of which 20.8% had children under the age of 18 living with them, 54.2% were married couples living together, 4.2% had a female householder with no husband present, and 41.7% were non-families. 37.5% of all households were made up of individuals, and 25% had someone living alone who was 65 years of age or older. The average household size was 2.17 and the average family size was 2.71.

The median age in the city was 49 years. 15.4% of residents were under the age of 18; 11.5% were between the ages of 18 and 24; 17.2% were from 25 to 44; 40.5% were from 45 to 64; and 15.4% were 65 years of age or older. The gender makeup of the city was 48.1% male and 51.9% female.

2000 census
As of the census of 2000, there were 69 people, 25 households, and 17 families residing in the city. The racial makeup of the city was 100.00% White.

There were 25 households, out of which 36.0% had children under the age of 18 living with them, 56.0% were married couples living together, 8.0% had a female householder with no husband present, and 32.0% were non-families. 16.0% of all households were made up of individuals, and 12.0% had someone living alone who was 65 years of age or older. The average household size was 2.76 and the average family size was 3.35.

In the city, the population was spread out, with 33.3% under the age of 18, 7.2% from 18 to 24, 21.7% from 25 to 44, 26.1% from 45 to 64, and 11.6% who were 65 years of age or older. The median age was 36 years. For every 100 females, there were 76.9 males. For every 100 females age 18 and over, there were 91.7 males.

As of 2000 the median income for a household was $36,875, and the median income for a family was $46,667. Males had a median income of $34,375 versus $19,375 for females. The per capita income for the city was $14,079. There were no families and 7.6% of the population living below the poverty line, including no under eighteens and 20.0% of those over 64.

References

Cities in North Dakota
Cities in Richland County, North Dakota
Populated places established in 1899
1899 establishments in North Dakota
Wahpeton micropolitan area